Carnivàle is an American fantasy television series created by Daniel Knauf for HBO. The series premiered on September 14, 2003, on HBO and finished its two-season run of 24 episodes on March 27, 2005. Until late in the second season, each episode is split into two distinct but slowly converging storylines taking place in the United States Dustbowl of the mid-1930s. Nick Stahl starred as Ben Hawkins, a young Okie farmer with strange powers who joins a traveling carnival; Clancy Brown played his adversary Brother Justin Crowe, a California preacher who uses his similarly strange abilities to rise to power. Carnivàle was originally intended to run as a trilogy of paired seasons, with each pair being called a "book" and the series as a whole spanning the years from 1934 to 1945, but the series was canceled after two seasons due to low ratings. These two seasons complete the first book covering the years 1934 and 1935. The second book (seasons three and four) would have taken place around the years 1939 and 1940, and the third book (seasons five and six) would have played in 1944 and 1945, leading up to the end of World War II and the explosion at the Trinity test site.

The character of Samson, the diminutive co-manager of the carnival, sets up each season with a monologue, giving glimpses of the show's complex story and good-versus-evil mythology. By telling the story visually and deploying dialogue sparely, Carnivàle is a demanding show with a lot of subtext, and similar to reading chapters of a book, viewers need to watch episodes of Carnivàle in the right order or risk being spoiled with too little or too much story information. Many reviewers found the story too slow and confusing, but praised the show for its cinematography and realistic portrayal of the 1930s. Carnivàle received much award recognition in mostly technical categories, including fifteen Emmy nominations with five wins.

The stops of the carnival throughout the Southwestern United States play a significant part in the show, with many episodes bearing the name of the location of Ben and the carnival. Some stops like Alamogordo, New Mexico are of historical significance; others are fictional. The only episode titled after Brother Justin's location is Season 1's "The River". Both seasons of Carnivàle were filmed in Southern California, with the carnival set being moved to movie ranches and Lancaster. Brother Justin's story in the fictional Mintern, California was shot at Paramount Ranch in Malibu. The permanent filming location of the carnival in Season 2 was Big Sky Ranch, which was also used for Brother Justin's new home in fictional New Canaan. The show's interiors were filmed at Santa Clarita Studios.

Series overview

Episodes

Season 1 (2003)

Season 2 (2005)

Location notes

a. ^ Mintern is a fictional town in the San Joaquin Valley in San Benito County, California, near Salinas. When Brother Justin loses his faith in God in the middle of Season 1, he leaves his Mintern home and heads for the San Joaquin Valley wilderness near Kingsburg. After visiting Norman in the hospital early in Season 2, Brother Justin and Iris head home and pass a tree; Justin names this location "New Canaan", the future site of his temple. New Canaan is also located in San Benito County, California, south of Salinas. The last Season 2 episode is named "New Canaan, CA" on DVDs.

b. ^ Babylon is a fictional town in Texas. It became a ghost town after a cave-in in 1921 killed all miners but Scudder. There is a historical reference to a real Babylon, Texas located in Navarro County.

c. ^ Los Moscos is a real area in Chihuahua, Mexico, near the southwest U.S. New Mexico border, but its significance as the name of the first season 2 episode is never clarified. It is however established that Ben and the carnival spend most of their time in Loving, New Mexico during this and the previous episodes. Carnivàle suggests that Loving does not refer to Loving, New Mexico in the southeast of the state, near Texas, since the (fictional) town is said to be less than a mile from the Mexican border in the Western part of New Mexico, thematically and geographically likely close to Los Moscos.

d. Alamogordo, New Mexico was the headquarters of the Trinity site, where humankind's first nuclear test took place in 1945. Ben's vision of the atomic bomb takes place in a desert nearby, ten years before the nuclear explosion would actually occur.

e. ^ Lincoln Highway is the first road across America, conceived in 1912. During the episode, the carnival rests in Wyoming close to the Nebraska border, but the episode is misleadingly called "Lincoln Highway, UT" on DVDs.

References

External links 
 
 

Episodes
Lists of American drama television series episodes